Alxa Left Banner Bayanhot Airport  is a regional airport serving Bayanhot, the main urban center of Alxa Left Banner in Inner Mongolia, China.

Overview
Bayanhot Airport is one of the three airports of Alxa League in western Inner Mongolia, the other two being Alxa Right Banner Badanjilin Airport and Ejin Banner Taolai Airport. The three airports form a commuter airport network that connects the three banners of Alxa League, which covers a vast area of the Gobi Desert.

Construction for the airports started in August 2012, with a total investment of 389.5 million yuan, and all three airports opened on 17 December 2013. All three airports are classified 3C, suitable for 50-seat aircraft such as the Xian MA60. Bayanhot is the biggest among the three, and it is projected to handle 250,000 passengers annually by 2020, compared with 80,000 for Taolai and 45,000 for Badanjilin.

Airlines and destinations

Statistics

See also
List of the busiest airports in China

References

Airports in Inner Mongolia
Airports established in 2013
2013 establishments in China
Buildings and structures in Alxa League